Brachycybe petasata is a species of millipede in the family Andrognathidae. It is found in North America.

References

Further reading

 

Millipedes of North America
Articles created by Qbugbot
Animals described in 1936
Platydesmida